Phnom Aural Wildlife Sanctuary is a protected area in central Cambodia, covering . It was established in 1993. It is named after Phnom Aural, the country's tallest peak at 1,810 m (5,940 ft). The Aural mountains are part of the much larger Cardamom Mountains. 

Immediately east of Phnom Aural Wildlife Sanctuary is the protected forest known as Central Cardamom Mountains.

This area is threatened by the exceptional danger of illegal logging.

The IBA supports the conservation of two bird populations that have a limited presence in the endemic bird area between the mountains of Cambodia and Thailand. These are the Chestnut-headed Partridge and the Cambodian Laughingthrush Garrulax ferrarius.

References

External links 

 Map of protected areas in Cambodia

Wildlife sanctuaries of Cambodia
Protected areas of Cambodia
Protected areas established in 1993
Geography of Kampong Speu province
Geography of Pursat province
Cardamom Mountains